Kaba is a town in eastern Hungary, in the county of Hajdú-Bihar. The town is located along the Hungarian Route 4, approximately 190 km from Budapest, the capital city and 32 km west from Debrecen, the county seat.

A  meteorite landed near Kaba in 1857.

International relations

Twin towns – sister cities
Kaba is twinned with:

  Aleșd, Romania  
  Cetariu, Romania

References

External links

  in Hungarian

Populated places in Hajdú-Bihar County